Monochamus x-fulvum is a species of beetle in the family Cerambycidae. It was described by Henry Walter Bates in 1884. It has a wide distribution throughout Africa.

References

x-fulvum
Beetles described in 1884